The 2019 Tuen Mun District Council election was held on 24 November 2019 to elect all 31 elected members to the 32-member Tuen Mun District Council.

Amid the massive pro-democracy protests in 2019, Junius Ho who was a key anti-protest figure who was allegedly involved in the Yuen Long attack was challenged by Lo Chun-yu in his constituency in the November election. A historic landslide victory occurred as the pro-democrats took 28 of the 31 seats in the council with Ho being unseated. A local political group Tuen Mun Community Network also grabbed three seats as a result.

Overall election results
Before election:

Change in composition:

References

External links
 Election Results - Overall Results

2019 Hong Kong local elections